Richard Atkins (1559–1581) was an English Protestant martyr.

Richard Atkins may also refer to:

Sir Richard Atkins, 1st Baronet, of the Atkins baronets
Sir Richard Atkins, 2nd Baronet (1654–1696), English politician
Sir Richard Atkins, 6th Baronet, High Sheriff of Buckinghamshire
Richard Atkins (diplomat) (1931–1998), New Zealand public servant and diplomat
Richie Atkins, fictional character in TV series Bad Girls

See also
Richard Atkyns (1615–1677), English writer